The National Amateur Baseball Federation (NABF) is a nonprofit organization that serves as a governing body for amateur baseball in the United States. The organization was founded in Louisville, Kentucky in 1914 and is the oldest continually-operated national amateur baseball organization in the United States.

The NABF holds over 50 regional championship and eight national championship tournaments at various skill levels and age groups, ranging from 10 and under youth, teen, summer collegiate, senior, and major.

World series tournaments
See footnote
Rookie World Series (10U)
Freshman World Series (12&U)
Sophomore World Series (14&U)
Junior World Series (16&U)
High School World Series (17&U)
Senior World Series (18&U)
College World Series (22&U)
Major World Series (unlimited)

See also
Baseball awards#U.S. amateur baseball
Baseball awards#U.S. youth baseball
Baseball awards#U.S. collegiate summer baseball

References

External links 
Official site

Amateur baseball in the United States
Youth baseball in the United States
Baseball governing bodies in the United States
Sports organizations established in 1914
1914 establishments in Kentucky